Cover-More Group is a global travel insurance and medical assistance provider headquartered in Sydney, Australia. The group was acquired by Zurich Insurance Group in April 2017. The company has more than 40% share of the Australian market. The group also has leading market positions in India, Ireland, Latin America, New Zealand and the USA where Cover-More owns Travelex Insurance Services. The global group has more than 18 million customers and employs more than 2200 people. Cover-More has operations in 22 countries including Australia, New Zealand, India, China, Malaysia, the United Kingdom, the USA, Canada, Brazil and Argentina.

History
Cover-More Group was established in 1986 in Sydney, Australia. A partnership to provide travel insurance services for Flight Centre Travel Group, a travel agency network, started in 1991 and continues to this day.

Cover-More Group expanded to the UK in 1996 and started a medical assistance business in 1997. In 2007 the company established Travelsure in New Zealand which was later rebranded to Cover-More.

In 2011 Australia Post announced that they would offer travel insurance at post offices in partnership with Cover-More. A partnership with Medibank began the same year providing discounted travel insurance to Medibank members.

The company expanded into Asia when it acquired Assistance Online, a medical and travel assistance company based in Shanghai, in March 2012. Assistance Online provides coverage in China, Hong Kong, Singapore, Macau, Taiwan and Mongolia.

In November 2013, Cover-More partnered with Indian company TrawellTag who rebranded to TrawellTag Cover-More.

Before Cover-More went public, Crescent Capital Partners owned 82.7 percent of the company. Crescent Capital would own 13 percent of the company after the initial public offering (IPO) in December 2013. At that time, it was the first and only Australian travel insurance provider to list on the Australian Stock Exchange. Cover-More reported earnings of $13.3 million in 2013. In June 2014, Cover-More announced a partnership with Qunar, a Chinese online travel agency.

Cover-More Group Limited was acquired by Zurich Insurance Group in April 2017 at a price of AUD 1.90 per share, approximately AUD 722 million in total.

In 2017, Cover-More announced it would be introducing an Australian-first in travel insurance, offering cancel-for-any-reason cover, with the policy available through Flight centre, Helloworld Travel, Magellan, Travellers Choice, independent travel consultancies and brokers.

Cover-More became the official travel insurance partner for UK football team Arsenal F.C. in October 2017. The club announced that the partnership would run for three seasons, starting from December 2017.

Zurich Insurance Group announced on 12 March 2018 that it had agreed to acquire 19 Latin American legal entities in the traveler assistance market to be managed by Cover-More Group. Operating under the Travel Ace and Universal Assistance brands, the combined business holds the leading market position in Argentina and the number two market position in Brazil while also operating in Chile, Colombia, Mexico, Panama, Spain, Uruguay and the US.

On 23 July 2018 Cover-More Group announced the acquisition of Blue Insurance, an Irish company specialising in a range of insurance products and trading in Ireland, UK and Australia.

In November 2020, Cover-More Group announced the appointment of Cara Morton to the role of global chief executive officer.

References

Travel insurance companies
Financial services companies established in 1986
Insurance companies of Australia
Australian companies established in 1986